Romodanovo is a rural locality (a settlement) and the administrative center of Romodanovsky District of the Republic of Mordovia, Russia. Population:

References

Notes

Sources

Rural localities in Mordovia
Romodanovsky District
Saransky Uyezd